Rafael Barcelos Soriano (born 21 July 1985) is a Brazilian football coach. Currently without a club.

Career 

In July 2021, Soriano was announced as coach of Sampaio Corrêa.

In December 2021, Rafael took charge of Desportiva Ferroviária, to compete in the Campeonato Capixaba of the following year.

On April 10, 2022, Rafael attacked referee assistant Marcielly Netto with a headbutt, during halftime in the match against Nova Venécia, for the Campeonato Capixaba. Shortly after the incident, Desportiva announced the dismissal of the coach. The following day, Soriano was preventively suspended by the Tribunal de Justiça de Desportiva do Espírito Santo for 30 days.  On April 26, the TJE-ES sentenced the coach to a suspension of 200 days.

References

1985 births
Living people
People from Campos dos Goytacazes
Brazilian football managers
Campeonato Brasileiro Série D managers
Cardoso Moreira Futebol Clube managers
Americano Futebol Clube managers
Sampaio Corrêa Futebol e Esporte managers
Desportiva Ferroviária managers
Associação Atlética Internacional (Limeira) managers
Sportspeople from Rio de Janeiro (state)